Khalid Assar (born 10 December 1992) is an Egyptian table tennis player. At the 2016 Summer Olympics he competed in the Men's Singles where he lost to Wang Jianan of Congo in the preliminary round.

He qualified to represent Egypt at the 2020 Summer Olympics.

His brother is fellow Olympian, Omar Assar.

References

External links
 
 
 

1992 births
Living people
Egyptian male table tennis players
Olympic table tennis players of Egypt
Table tennis players at the 2016 Summer Olympics
Table tennis players at the 2020 Summer Olympics
African Games medalists in table tennis
African Games gold medalists for Egypt
African Games silver medalists for Egypt
African Games bronze medalists for Egypt
Competitors at the 2015 African Games
Competitors at the 2019 African Games
People from Desouk
21st-century Egyptian people